Mark Stodola (born May 18, 1949) is an American politician and lawyer. First elected in 2006, he served as the Mayor of Little Rock, Arkansas, from January 2007 through December 2018. Stodola won re-election to a second, four-year term in November 2010 by a landslide 84.73 percent of the vote. His re-election in 2014 was unopposed. Stodola is currently president of the National League of Cities.

Family
Stodola is married to his wife Jo Ellen and together they have 3 children: one daughter named Allison and twin sons named John Mark and Robert.

Organizations
Stodola is currently a member of the Rotary Club in Little Rock. Stodola graduated from the Leadership Greater Little Rock, and has also served as Chair of Class 16 for the same program. He is also a member of the Heights Neighborhood Association and serves as Co-Chair of the Downtown Partnership's Main Street Task Force. Stodola has made time to serve on the Board of the Arkansas Repertory Theatre and is Past-President of the Quapaw Quarter Association and the Historic Preservation Alliance of Arkansas.  Lastly, the mayor has worked with the Big Brothers Big Sisters program.

References

External links
Little Rock Mayor's Office: Mayor Mark Stodola

Mayors of Little Rock, Arkansas
American prosecutors
Arkansas Democrats
University of Iowa alumni
University of Arkansas School of Law alumni
People from Cedar Rapids, Iowa
1949 births
Living people
Mayors of places in Arkansas
21st-century American politicians